

Current squad
As of 4 January 2017

Out on loan

Transfers

In

Out

Competitions

Serie B

League table

References

External links
Official Site

Virtus Entella
Virtus Entella